Pycnoporopepsin (proteinase Ia, Pycnoporus coccineus aspartic proteinase, Trametes acid proteinase) is an enzyme. This enzyme catalyses the following chemical reaction

 Similar to pepsin A, but narrower, cleaving only three bonds in the B chain of insulin: Ala14-Leu, Tyr16-Leu, and Phe24-Phe

This enzyme is isolated from the basidiomycete Pycnoporus sanguineus.

References

External links 
 

EC 3.4.23